USS Taniwha (SP-129) was an armed yacht that served in the United States Navy as a patrol vessel from 1917 to 1919.
 
Taniwha was built as a civilian yacht in 1909 by the George Lawley & Son at Neponset, Massachusetts. The U.S. Navy acquired Taniwha under a free lease from her owner, Mr. Henry B. Anderson of New York City, for use as a patrol boat during World War I and commissioned the same day as USS Taniwha (SP-129). The date of her de facto acquisition and commissioning is reported both as 14 May 1917 and as 18 May 1917, although the Navy did not formalize her acquisition from Anderson until several months later, on 29 September 1917.

Assigned to the 3rd Naval District, Taniwha operated on section patrol protecting waters near New York City against incursions by enemy forces, particularly submarines. Her service to the Navy continued through the end of hostilities, which came on 11 November 1918.

Taniwha was decommissioned on 4 April 1919, and her name was stricken from the Navy List on the same day. She was returned to her owner either that day or in early June 1919.

Notes

References

Department of the Navy Naval Historical Center Online Library of Selected Images: Civilian Ships: USS Taniwha (SP-129), 1917-1919. Originally the Civilian Motor Yacht Taniwha (1909)
NavSource Online: Section Patrol Craft Photo Archive: Taniwha (SP 129)

Patrol vessels of the United States Navy
World War I patrol vessels of the United States
Ships built in Boston
1909 ships
Individual yachts